Renato Anselmi (26 October 1891 – 3 October 1973) was an Italian fencer. He won a gold and two silver medals at three Olympic Games in the team sabre competitions.

References

External links
 

1891 births
1973 deaths
People from Marigliano
Italian male fencers
Olympic fencers of Italy
Fencers at the 1924 Summer Olympics
Fencers at the 1928 Summer Olympics
Fencers at the 1932 Summer Olympics
Olympic gold medalists for Italy
Olympic silver medalists for Italy
Olympic medalists in fencing
Medalists at the 1924 Summer Olympics
Medalists at the 1928 Summer Olympics
Medalists at the 1932 Summer Olympics
Sportspeople from the Province of Naples